The China women's national water polo team represents China in international women's water polo competitions and friendly matches. It is one of the leading teams in Asia.

Results

Olympic Games

2008 – 5th place
2012 – 5th place
2016 – 7th place
2020 – 8th place

World Championship

2005 – 16th place
2007 – 14th place
2009 – 11th place
2011 –  Silver medal
2013 – 9th place
2015 – 5th place
2017 – 10th place
2019 – 11th place
2022 – Withdrawn

World Cup

2006 – 8th place
2010 –  Bronze medal
2014 – 4th place

World League

 2007 – 6th place
 2008 – 5th place
 2009 – 5th place
 2010 – 5th place
 2011 – 4th place
 2012 – 4th place
 2013 –  Gold medal
 2014 – 4th place
 2015 – 4th place
 2016 – 4th place
 2017 – 6th place
 2018 – 6th place

Asian Games

 2010 –  Gold medal
 2014 –  Gold medal
 2018 –  Gold medal

Asian Swimming Championships

 2012 –  Gold medal
 2016 –  Gold medal

Asian Water Polo Championship

2009 –  Gold medal
2012 –  Gold medal
2015 –  Gold medal

Asian Cup
 2013 –  Gold medal

Current squad
Roster for the 2020 Summer Olympics.

Under-20 team
China's women finished as runner-up at the 2007 FINA Junior Water Polo World Championships.

See also
 China women's Olympic water polo team records and statistics

References

Women's national water polo teams
Women's water polo in China